GMV Nashville is a digital record label based in Nashville, Tennessee, founded by Jeff Walker in 2007.

History
Walker founded the label primarily to release digital versions of classic releases from Con Brio Records, which was founded by Walker and his father, Bill Walker.  Con Brio Records was active from 1975 to 1979 and won Billboard Magazine's "Best New Label Of The Year" in 1977.

GMV Nashville's first releases included out-of-print material from Con Brio artists Terri Hollowell, Dale McBride, Lori Parker, and Don King.  It later expanded its catalog to include contemporary artists such as Lane Brody, Maggie Sajak, Exile, Amber Hayes special releases from the Charlie Daniels Band, Toy Caldwell's only solo album, and compilations such as the This Is My America collection.

Artists
Adam Gregory
Amber Hayes
Bill Walker
Bobby Cyrus
Charlie Daniels Band
Chelsea Field
Chester Lester
Craig Morrison
Dale McBride
Deborah Allen
Don King
Exile
Jan Howard
Jeanine Walker
John Daly
Lane Brody
Lori Parker
Maggie Sajak
Scott Summer
Sheila Tilton
Terri Hollowell
Toy Caldwell

Series releases
Country Hits You Missed series
This Is My America compilation featuring Dolly Parton, Billy Dean, and Kathy Mattea

See also
Con Brio Records
AristoMedia

Notes

"Country Artists Soundtrack The Holidays"
"GMV Nashville Adds Classic Titles To Digital Catalog"
"Iconic Golfer John Daly Releases New Album, 'I Only Know One Way'"
"Lacy Green 'For The Summertime' on iTunes"

External Links
 gmvnashville.com
 

American country music record labels